Rheodytes is a genus of turtle in the Chelidae family from Australia. 
It contains the following species:
 Fitzroy River turtle (Rheodytes leukops)
 † Rheodytes devisi (Pleistocene)

References

 
Turtle genera
Reptile genera with one living species
Taxonomy articles created by Polbot